Virgin soil epidemic is a term coined by Alfred Crosby, who defined it as epidemics "in which the populations at risk have had no previous contact with the diseases that strike them and are therefore immunologically almost defenseless." His concept is related to that developed by William McNeill, who connected the development of agriculture and more sedentary life with the emergence of new diseases as microbes moved from domestic animals to humans. Virgin soil epidemics have occurred with European colonization, particularly when European explorers and colonists brought diseases to lands they conquered in the Americas, Australia and Pacific Islands.

The concept would later be adopted wholesale by Jared Diamond as a central theme in his popular book Guns, Germs and Steel as an explanation for successful European expansion.

When a population has not had contact with a particular pathogen, individuals in that population have not built up any immunity to that organism and so have not received immunity passed from mother to child. The epidemiologist Francis Black has suggested that some isolated populations may not have mixed enough to become as genetically heterogeneous as their colonizers, which would also have affected their natural immunity. That can happen also when such a considerable amount of time has passed between disease outbreaks that no one in a particular community has ever experienced the disease to gain immunity. Consequently, when a previously unknown disease is introduced to such a population, there is an increase in the morbidity and mortality rates. Historically, that increase has been often devastating and always noticeable.

Diseases introduced to the Americas by Europeans and Africans include smallpox, yellow fever, measles and malaria as well as new strains of typhus and influenza.

Virgin soil epidemics also occurred in other regions. For example, the Roman Empire spread smallpox to new populations in Europe and the Middle East in the 2nd century AD, and the Mongol Empire brought the bubonic plague to Europe and the Middle East in the 14th century.



Debate 
Research over the last few decades has questioned some aspects of the notion of virgin soil epidemics. David S. Jones has argued that the term "virgin soil" is often used to describe a genetic predisposition to disease infection and that it obscures the more complex social, environmental, and biological factors that can enhance or reduce a population's susceptibility.

Paul Kelton has argued that the slave trade in indigenous people by Europeans exacerbated the spread and virulence of smallpox and that a virgin soil model alone cannot account for the widespread disaster of the epidemic.

Cristobal Silva has re-examined accounts by colonists of 17th-century New England epidemics and has interpreted and argued that they were products of particular historical circumstances, rather than universal or genetically inevitable processes.

Historian Christopher R. Browning writes that "Disease, colonization, and irreversible demographic decline were intertwined and mutually reinforcing" in reference to virgin soil epidemics during the European colonisation of the Americas. He contrasts the rebound of the European population following the Black Death with the lack of such a rebound across most Native American populations, attributing this differing demographic trend to the fact that Europeans were not exploited, enslaved, and massacred in the aftermath of the Black Death like the indigenous inhabitants of the New World were. "Disease as the chief killing agent," he writes, "does not remove settler colonialism from the rubric of genocide".

Following this work, historian Jeffrey Ostler has argued that, in relation to European colonization of the Americas, "virgin soil epidemics did not occur everywhere and ... Native populations did not inevitably crash as a result of contact. Most Indigenous communities were eventually afflicted by a variety of diseases, but in many cases this happened long after Europeans first arrived. When severe epidemics did hit, it was often less because Native bodies lacked immunity than because European colonialism disrupted Native communities and damaged their resources, making them more vulnerable to pathogens."

See also
 Columbian Exchange
 Ecological imperialism
 Influx of disease in the Caribbean
 Seasoning (colonialism)
 Native American disease and epidemics
 Millenarianism in colonial societies
 Cocoliztli epidemics

References
Footnotes

Bibliography

 
 
 

Epidemics
History of colonialism